Helsinki Comics Festival is an annual free cultural event in Helsinki, Finland. It has become the largest comics event in North-Europe. The festival is typically held in early September.

The festival has been organized by the Finnish Comics Society since 1979. Activities include a comic market, exhibitions throughout the city, public discussion, presentations, comic guests, competitions, and children's activities. The festival also gives space for many self-published works and zines to be presented to the public.

References

External links 
 

Comics conventions
Festivals in Helsinki
Annual events in Finland
Autumn events in Finland